Lake Travis Independent School District is a public school district headquartered in Austin, Texas, (USA). It was created on June 12, 1981 after school board members decided to split the Dripping Springs Independent School District in order to handle the growing population of the Lake Travis area.

In 2011, the school district was rated "Exemplary" by the Texas Education Agency.

Geography
Its boundaries are the Travis/Hays county line on the south, the shores of Lake Travis to the north, the Pedernales River to the west, and Lake Austin and Barton Creek to the east.

Incorporated communities in the district include Bee Cave, Briarcliff, Lakeway, and The Hills. Hudson Bend, a census-designated place, is also in the district.

Schools

High School (Grades 9-12)
Lake Travis High School - Unincorporated area

Middle Schools (Grades 6-8)
Hudson Bend Middle School (Unincorporated area)
Lake Travis Middle School (Spicewood, Unincorporated area)
Bee Cave Middle School

Elementary Schools (Grades K-5)
Bee Cave Elementary School (Bee Cave)
Lake Pointe Elementary School (Unincorporated area)
Lake Travis Elementary School (Lakeway)
Lakeway Elementary School (Lakeway)
Serene Hills Elementary School (Lakeway)
West Cypress Hills Elementary (Spicewood, Unincorporated area)

Bonds
Voters in Lake Travis have approved of over $321 million in bonds for the LT school district for the past ten years.

References

External links

Lake Travis ISD

School districts in Travis County, Texas
Education in Austin, Texas
School districts established in 1981
1981 establishments in Texas